Cangjie  is a legendary ancient Chinese figure said to have been an official historian of the Yellow Emperor and the inventor of Chinese characters. Legend has it that he had four eyes, and that when he invented the characters, the deities and ghosts cried and the sky rained millet. He is considered a legendary rather than historical figure, or at least not considered to be sole inventor of Chinese characters. Cangjie was the eponym for the (c. 220 BCE) Cangjiepian proto-dictionary, the Cangjie method of inputting characters into a computer, and a Martian rock visited by the Mars rover Spirit, and named by the rover team.

Legend of character creation

There are several versions of the legend.

One tells that shortly after unifying China, the Yellow Emperor, being dissatisfied with the "rope knot tying" method of recording information, charged Cangjie with the task of creating characters for writing. Cangjie then settled down on the bank of a river, and devoted himself to the completion of the task at hand. Even after devoting much time and effort, however, he was unable to create even one character. One day, Cangjie suddenly saw a phoenix flying in the sky above, carrying an object in its beak. The object fell to the ground directly in front of Cangjie, and he saw it to be an impression of a hoof-print. Not being able to recognize which animal the print belonged to, he asked for the help of a local hunter passing by on the road. The hunter told him that this was, without a doubt, the hoof print of a Pixiu, being different from the hoof-print of any other beast that was alive.

His conversation with the hunter greatly inspired Cangjie, leading him to believe that if he could capture in a drawing the special characteristics that set apart each and every thing on the earth, this would truly be the perfect kind of character for writing. From that day forward, Cangjie paid close attention to the characteristics of all things, including the sun, moon, stars, clouds, lakes, oceans, as well as all manner of bird and beast. He began to create characters according to the special characteristics he found, and before long, had compiled a long list of characters for writing.

To the delight of the Yellow Emperor, Cangjie presented him with the complete set of characters. The emperor then called the premiers of each of the nine provinces together in order for Cangjie to teach them this new writing system. Monuments and temples were erected in Cangjie's honor on the bank of the river where he created these characters.

Another version of the legend tells that Cangjie was inspired by observing the network of veins on a turtle. This version is particularly interesting relative to archaeology because turtle shells are one of the most common media on which the earliest known Chinese inscriptions are found, including the Jiahu symbols.

Remains and commemorations 
There are tombs dedicated to Cangjie in the provinces of Shandong, Henan, Hebei, and Shaanxi. His descendants are said to bear the surname Shǐ (史), in recognition of his service as official historiographer.

See also
Neolithic signs in China
Oracle bone script
Cangjie input method

References

Creators of writing systems
Chinese characters
Legendary Chinese people
Ancient Chinese historians
Deified Chinese people
Characters in Chinese mythology